Pesarapadu is a village in Srikakulam district of the Indian state of Andhra Pradesh. It located in Palasa mandal.

References 

Villages in Srikakulam district